Edward Heather (6 October 1848 – 10 July 1935) was an Australian cricketer. He played one first-class cricket match for Victoria in 1871.

Heather was the honorary secretary of the Victorian Cricket Association for 30 years. He was a councillor for the City of South Melbourne for 18 years and served as mayor in 1888-89. He worked as secretary and librarian of the Emerald Hill Mechanics Institute, and then, when the Institute library became the South Melbourne library, as librarian for the City of South Melbourne, a combined service of 38 years from 1881 to 1919.

See also
 List of Victoria first-class cricketers

References

1848 births
1935 deaths
Australian cricketers
Victoria cricketers
People from Marylebone
Cricketers from Greater London
Australian cricket administrators
Mayors of places in Victoria (Australia)
Australian librarians